Birmingham Northfield is a constituency represented in the House of Commons of the UK Parliament since 2019 by Gary Sambrook, a Conservative. It represents the southernmost part of the city of Birmingham.

Members of Parliament

Constituency profile

Among the area's largest features is the Longbridge Town shopping area built on the site of the now demolished MG Rover Group factory which for decades had been a major employer in the constituency but which was closed down in the run up to the 2005 general election, two hospitals, Northfield Shopping Centre and the now also closed North Worcestershire Golf Course. Despite the closure of the Longbridge Motor works the Labour MP at the time, Richard Burden was returned in the subsequent general election with his majority reduced by 5.6%. He was re-elected with his  majority further reduced by 14.1% in 2010. In 2015, Burden was re-elected with a majority of 2,509 votes and a vote share of 41.6%, which made Northfield the most marginal seat in Birmingham. Two years later at the 2017 snap election, Burden increased his majority to 4,667 votes and his vote share to 53.2% on an overall turnout of 44,348 voters.

At the 2019 general election, the seat was won by the Conservative candidate Gary Sambrook with a majority of 1,640 votes. The Conservatives therefore held the Birmingham Northfield seat for the first time in 27 years.

Boundaries
1950–1955: The County Borough of Birmingham Wards of Northfield, Selly Oak, and Weoley.

1955–1974: The County Borough of Birmingham wards of King's Norton, Northfield, and Weoley.

1974–1983: As above less King's Norton, plus Longbridge

1983–1997: The City of Birmingham wards of Bartley Green, Longbridge, Northfield, and Weoley.

1997–2010: As above less Bartley Green

2010–present: As above plus King's Norton

Following the review of parliamentary representation in Birmingham and the West Midlands, the Boundary Commission for England created a modified Northfield seat which gained the ward of Kings Norton (previously in the Selly Oak constituency).

History
Summary of results
The 2015 result gave the seat the 26th-smallest majority of Labour's 232 seats by percentage of majority.

From its creation in 1950 until 2019, Labour Party MPs were elected and served the seat, with the exception of the period from 1979 to 1992, which was whilst the Conservative Party were in government, with a one-year gap caused by a Labour win at a 1982 by-election. From 1979 to 1982, the MP was Jocelyn Cadbury, a member of the influential and large Cadbury family.

Opposition parties
The Conservative candidate for 2015, MacLean, came within 5.9% of winning the seat. UKIP's swing nationally was +9.5% in 2015; here it was 13.5%, enabling a third place, having been fifth-placed in the previous election.  The other two candidates, standing for parties other than Labour on the left, narrowly forfeited their deposits.

Turnout
Turnout has ranged between 84.7% in 1950 and 52.8% in 2001 (which was below the percentage of the 1982 by-election).

Elections

Elections in the 2010s

Going into the 2015 general election, this was the 121st most marginal constituency in Great Britain, the Conservatives requiring a swing from Labour of 3.3% to take the seat (based on the result of the 2010 general election).

Elections in the 2000s

Elections in the 1990s

Elections in the 1980s

Elections in the 1970s

Elections in the 1960s

Elections in the 1950s

See also
List of parliamentary constituencies in the West Midlands (county)

Notes

References

External links 
 Birmingham city council constituency page

Parliamentary constituencies in Birmingham, West Midlands
Constituencies of the Parliament of the United Kingdom established in 1950